Keighley West (population 15,784 - 2001 UK census) is a ward within the City of Bradford Metropolitan District Council in the county of West Yorkshire, England. The population at the 2011 Census was 16,551.

Councillors 
Keighley West ward is represented on Bradford Council by two Labour Party councillors, Cath Bacon and Adrian Farley and an independent councillor Brian Morris.

 indicates seat up for re-election.
 indicates councillor defection.

References

External links 
BCSP (Internet Explorer only)
BBC election results
Council ward profile (pdf)
thetelegraphandargus.co.uk

Wards of Bradford
Keighley